Established by the United States Conference of Catholic Bishops (USCCB) in 1979, the Catholic Communication Campaign (CCC) responds to the national and local communications needs of the Church through an annual collection which is held in most dioceses in May.

Dioceses participating in the collection keep half of the proceeds to support local communications efforts such as televised Masses and diocesan newspapers, and send the remaining funds to the national CCC office to support the development and production of a wide range of communication initiatives that are carried out by USCCB staff and grantee organizations.

A portion of the CCC's national funds are also set aside for grants to aid Catholic communication efforts in developing nations.

References

External links
Catholic Communication Campaign

Christian organizations established in 1979
United States Conference of Catholic Bishops
Catholic media